The Chronicon Petroburgense, or Peterborough Chronicle, is a 13th-century chronicle written in Medieval Latin at Peterborough Abbey, England, covering events from 1122 to 1294. It was probably written by William of Woodford, a sacrist and later abbot of Peterborough (1296–1299). It survives as part of a Peterborough cartulary known as the "Liber Niger", or "Black Book", where it appears on folios 75–80 and 85–136. The chronicle was edited by Thomas Stapleton and published by the Camden Society in 1849, with an appendix containing a transcription of the first 20 folios of the Liber Niger. In his introduction to Stapleton's edition, John Bruce wrote that the Chronicon contained "valuable contributions to legal and constitutional history [that were] universally recognised".

References

Footnotes

Notes

Bibliography

13th-century history books
History of Peterborough